On 1 July 2002 in Uruzgan Province, Afghanistan, the United States Air Force carried out an airstrike on a wedding party in Uruzgan Province, Afghanistan. An AC130 attack plane and a B-52 bomber mistook the traditional nighttime wedding celebration as a gathering of Taliban. Weapons are often shot at weddings, and thus the presence of weapons and gunfire at a wedding is not unusual. The US planes thought they were being targeted by anti-aircraft fire and attacked. Four villages were attacked and 54 civilians were killed, with 50 more injured. The Afghan government backed up that it was a wedding, and that guests had fired bullets into the air in celebration. The attack is cited as one of many criminal negligence made by Coalition forces in the early days of the Afghan War, which increasingly drove more Afghans to fight for the Taliban. The killing of innocent family members demands severe revenge in the Pashtunwali tradition.

References

2002 in Afghanistan
2002 in international relations
2002 in the United States
July 2002 events in Asia
2002 airstrikes
21st-century history of the United States Air Force
21st century in Urozgan Province
Airstrikes during the War in Afghanistan (2001–2021)
Attacks on weddings
Explosions in 2002
Military operations of the War in Afghanistan (2001–2021) involving the United States
Attacks in Afghanistan in 2002